Daytop, or Daytop Village, is a drug addiction treatment organization with facilities in New York City. It was founded in 1963 in Tottenville, Staten Island by Daniel Harold Casriel along with Monsignor William B. O'Brien, a Roman Catholic priest and founder and president of the World Federation of Therapeutic Communities. Ron Brancato from the Pelham Bay area of Bronx New York, Program Director and former resident of Synanon, California. Synanon (founded by Charles E. "Chuck" Dederich Sr., (1913–1997) in 1958 in Santa Monica) was the only  drug rehabilitation program until Daytop Village NY.

According to Dr. Casriel its name was originally an acronym for 'Drug Addicts Yield to Probation' as Daytop was originally a kind of "halfway house" for convicted addicts. Another account gives the name to be an acronym for "Drug Addicts Yield to Persuasion". A third account gives the name to be an acronym for "Drug Addicts Yield to Others Persuasion."

The Daytop program, one of the oldest drug-treatment programs in the United States, is based on the therapeutic community model and emphasizes the role of peer interaction in their modes of treatment.  Considered one of the most successful programs of its kind, it is described as "a supportive emotional community in which people feel secure but at the same time are held strictly accountable for their behavior". It is estimated that 85 percent of those treated stay clean.

It was during a 1980 visit to Daytop Village that future first lady Nancy Reagan initially became aware of the drug epidemic in the United States and the toll it was taking on the nation's youth.  This event is widely acknowledged as the genesis of her "Just Say No" program.

In late 2015, Daytop Village merged with Samaritan Village, another 50+ year old health and human services nonprofit organization with a specialty in drug and alcohol treatment. The newly merged organization changed its name to Samaritan Daytop Village.

References

External links
 Daytop website
 World Federation of Therapeutic Communities

Drug and alcohol rehabilitation centers
Therapeutic community
Addiction organizations in the United States
Mental health organizations in New York (state)
1963 establishments in New York City